Venice Marco Polo Airport  is the international airport of Venice, Italy. Due to the importance of Venice as a leisure destination, it features flights to many European metropolitan areas as well as some partly seasonal long-haul routes to the United States, Canada, South Korea and the Middle East. The airport handled 11,184,608 passengers in 2018, making it the fourth-busiest airport in Italy. The airport is named after Marco Polo and serves as a base for Volotea, Ryanair, Wizz Air and easyJet.

Another airport located in the Venice area, Treviso Airport, is sometimes unofficially labelled as Venice – Treviso and mostly serves low-cost airlines, mainly Ryanair and Wizz Air.

Overview 
A modern terminal was opened in 2002, but it is already at full capacity. The airport is managed by SAVE S.p.A., a company partially owned by local authorities that also controls the smaller Treviso Airport, dedicated mainly to low-cost carriers. The airport was named after the Venetian traveller Marco Polo.

Terminal 

The airport terminal has three floors: the ground floor for arrivals and the second floor for departures. The departure area has 70 check-in desks and has two lounges airside for customers. The two departure lounges are the "Tintoretto Lounge" for SkyTeam customers and the "Marco Polo Room" for customers of all other companies. The third floor of the terminal has offices for the operating company and airlines. The departure gates area is separated for Schengen and non-Schengen flights.

Airlines and destinations

The following airlines operate regular scheduled and charter flights to and from Venice:

Statistics

Ground transportation
The airport is connected to the nearby railway station of Venice Mestre and to the bus terminal of Piazzale Roma in Venice by scheduled bus services; to several destinations in Venice itself by Alilaguna water shuttle (Blue, Red and Orange lines); and to Piazza San Marco by the express Gold Line or water taxi. From the airport it is possible to reach:

 Venice Piazzale Roma by ATVO (provincial company) buses and by ACTV (city company) buses (route 5 aerobus);
 Venice, Lido and Murano by Alilaguna (private company) motorboats;
 Mestre, the mainland and Venice Mestre railway station, providing connections to Milan, Padua, Trieste, Verona and the rest of Italy, by ACTV buses (route 15 and 45) and ATVO buses;
 regional destinations (Treviso, Padua, beaches ...) by ATVO buses and by Busitalia Sita Nord buses (national company).

Accidents and incidents
 On 6 March 1967, a Short Brothers SC.7 Skyvan 2–102, operated by Soc. Aeralpi, crashed while attempting to land in bad weather, crashing into the lagoon. All 3 on board survived.
 On 14 September 1993, an Italian Air Force Piaggio PD.808 crashed while attempting to land in bad weather, killing all 3 on board.
On 10 May 2014, an Airbus A330-200 serving as US Airways Flight 715, headed to Philadelphia from Venice, made an emergency landing at Dublin Airport in Ireland after nine flight attendants complained of nausea, dizziness and running eyes. There were no reports of the pilots or passengers falling ill.

References

External links

 Official website
 
 

Year of establishment missing
Transport in Venice
Airports in Veneto
20th-century establishments in Venice
Marco Polo